Rescorla may refer to:

People
 Rick Rescorla (1939–2001), British and American soldier, and security chief for Morgan Stanley who died in the 9/11 terrorist attack
 Robert A. Rescorla (1940–2020), American psychologist
 Leslie Rescorla (born 1945), American psychologist

Places
 Rescorla, Cornwall, village

Science
 Rescorla–Wagner model, description of the process of psychological conditioning

Cornish-language surnames